GOI Building (Also known as Government of India Building) is a high-rise located in Kolkata, India. It is located on Acharya Jagadish Chandra Bose Road. It is one of the tallest buildings in Kolkata.

Details
GOI Building is one of the most important buildings in the city. It is a commercial building and was built in 1978 inside Nizam Complex by Government of India. This building comprises a total of 20 floors. It houses numerous Government of India offices like CBI, FCI and so on.

See also
 List of tallest buildings in Kolkata

References

Office buildings in Kolkata
Skyscraper office buildings in India